Wallace Michael Ross (19 September 1920 – 20 January 2010) was the founder of the Derby Bach Choir. He was also the Master of Music at Derby Cathedral, assistant organist at several great English Cathedrals and a teacher of languages and music at several schools, including Sturgess School in Derby. He also founded the Derby Cathedral Brass Ensemble and the Derby Sinfonia.

Life and achievements
Wallace Ross was born in Yeovil. His father was a businessman with a pharmaceutical firm in Cambridge.

He attended King’s College Choir School, not as a chorister but as an ordinary pupil. After this, Wallace attended Rugby School and he followed Edward Heath at Balliol College, Oxford as Organ Scholar. World War II interrupted his studies and Wallace served as a gunner in Dover and Northern Ireland becoming a sergeant and an instructor in aircraft recognition. It is believed that at this time he met his "sweetheart", never to find a life together with her. After the war he continued at Balliol but did not achieve the doctorate he sought.

After Balliol, Wallace articled at Chichester Cathedral to Horace Hawkins, also known as Daddy Hawkins, where Wallace’s eccentricities were hinted at by Hawkins’ nickname for Wallace, Buffalo Bill. Apparently Wallace was not daunted when he had been locked out of the organ loft. He climbed up in an unregulated way to the loft “up and over”.
Posts of assistant organist were to follow, at Beverley Minster, Leicester Cathedral and Gloucester Cathedral. During these appointments Wallace was pursuing his career as teacher of music, classics, PT and rugby at various schools.

At Leicester, he was music master at Alderman Newton's School. His talent for performing and teaching music was established. Joining the Railway Working man’s club, Wallace extended his expertise playing with the band on the bass tuba. His hobbies of a glass of ale, and railway mania were fulfilled.

In 1958, Wallace was appointed as organist at Derby Cathedral. Working as a teacher of languages, history and music at Sturgess School he rapidly became well loved in the city. He coached and refereed Rugby Football over the years in Derby.

Wallace’s work as organist and master of music at the Cathedral took off at the enthronement of Bishop Allen in 1959. He wanted a fanfare to greet the Bishop; but he knew of no local musicians that might undertake the task. He got on to his network to get up a team of brass players from ex pupils and acquaintances. Bishop Allen was greeted by what became the Derby Cathedral Brass Ensemble.

In 1969, Wallace founded the Derby Bach choir. This body made joyous sounds and improved the singing skills of many in Derby. Soloists were national singers from London. The choir’s repertoire included challenging works of many modern composers.

Wallace frequently displayed eccentricities some of which derived from his love of railway steam engines. Many pupils and colleagues witnessed him walking along and pretending to be an engine (and its driver). Finding it hard to adapt to a changing world, he liked to do things in his own way. This caused problems and some were not very tolerant. Wallace found himself out of a job or two during his career. The last occasion of this was at the Cathedral when a new Provost felt that a new broom was required. The Parish of Kegworth gained from this as Wallace became organist there. Wallace later spoke warmly of his time there and of the Rector.

Although he had not married and had no family Wallace formed, in later life, a strong and lasting family bond with the Cartwright family.

Appointments 

King’s Coll. S., Cambridge; Rugby S. (Sch.) 1933–1938; R. Coll. Music 
1938–1939: Balliol 
1939:  Organist at Balliol College, Oxford 
1939–1940 and 1945–1947: Sch; Kitchener Sch; Organ Sch; Jasper Ridley Prize; Masefield Studentship; MA  1946; BMus. 1949 
Army 1940, gunner RA Light AA; 199th Bty. in Kent and Essex 
1941–1942: N. Ireland 
1942–1943: Sergt. 
1943: Instr., 7th AA Gp School in aircraft recognition, mines, and demolition 
1944–1946: Articled Pupil, Chichester Cathedral 
1947–1948: Director of Music, Pocklington School, Yorkshire 
1948: Assistant Organist, Beverley Minster 
1948: Limpus and Dr Read Prizes, FRCO 1950, CHM 
1951–1954: Music Master, Alderman Newton’s Boys’ School, Leicester and 2nd Asst. (organist) Leicester Cathedral
1951: Dep. Bandmaster, Leicester Railwaymen’s Silver Band 
1952: Guest Conductor, `British United’ Male Voice Choir 
1953: Second Assistant Organist, Gloucester Cathedral and Director of Music, King’s School, Gloucester
1954–1958: Assistant Organist at Gloucester Cathedral
1954: Dep. Conductor, Gloucester Festival Chorus and Glos. Orchestral Soc. 
1958–1982: Organist and Master of the Music, Derby Cathedral
1958–1980: Music Master, Sturgess School (later Woodlands Community School), Derby 
Founder/Conductor, Derby Cath. Brass Ensemble 1959 (Derby St John’s Brass Ensemble from 1982), Derby Bach Choir 1959–1990, Derby Cath. Orchestra 1966 (Derby Sinfonia 1982–1991) 
1983: Organist, St Andrew’s Church, Kegworth
1980: Engineman, Cadeby Steam Centre

References

Balliol College Archives & Manuscripts

1920 births
2010 deaths
English classical organists
British male organists
Cathedral organists
People educated at Rugby School
Alumni of Balliol College, Oxford
People from Yeovil
20th-century classical musicians
20th-century British male musicians
Male classical organists